Dowie is a surname, and may refer to: 

 Andy Dowie, Scottish footballer
 Freda Dowie, British actress
 Iain Dowie, former professional football player
 John Dowie (disambiguation), various people with this name
 Ménie Muriel Dowie (1867—1945), British writer
 Natasha Dowie, English professional football player

See also 

 Cowie (surname)
 Bowie (surname)

External links
The Dowie Family Name

Dowie: A Scottish Surname with Flemish roots? See:

https://flemish.wp.st-andrews.ac.uk/2014/09/12/dowie-a-scottish-surname-with-flemish-roots/

Surnames
Scottish surnames
Surnames of Scottish origin
Surnames of British Isles origin